Cirpack is an NGN (Next Generation Network), SBC (Session Border Controller) and IMS vendor for Telecommunications Operators, Internet and Application Service Providers, focusing on telephony services such as residential and business VoIP, IP Centrex, SIP Trunking, Triple play, Fixed Mobile Convergence, VoLTE, Transcoding etc.

History

Cirpack was founded in 1999 by Fred Potter as a spinoff of the French Long Distance Carrier  that had in-house switching experts and senior developers. Cirpack was acquired by Thomson SA (now Technicolor) in April 2005.

On top of its historical Softswitch devices product line, Cirpack introduced in 2010 its SBC (Session Border Controller) range, completed in 2011 by the Applications range.

In April 2014, Patrick Bergougnou took over Cirpack and became CEO.

In July 2015, Cirpack took over Andrexen, a French editor of voice over IP and unified communications software.

In September 2016, Cirpack took over Amplement, a professional social network.

Product lines
 Softswitching Solutions: this product range enables service providers to deploy NGN or VoIP architectures and/or migrate their legacy TDM networks to VoIP.
 Session Border Controller (SBC): deployed at the edge of VoIP network offering security, routing, media transcoding, fraud detection and SIP trunking solutions.
 IP Multimedia Subsystem: it includes all IMS proxy functions, and the Multimedia Telephony Application Server.

References

Telecommunications equipment vendors
Telecommunications companies of France
French companies established in 1999